Subvestinautilus  is a genus of evolute koninckioceratids, in the order Nautilida, with a depressed, trapezoidal whorl section. The venter is broadly rounded, ventrolateral shoulders sharply rounded, flanks flattened and converging toward a narrow rounded dorsum. In early  growth stages a keel forms on the umbilical shoulder which becomes rounded  or marked by a longitudal rib at maturity . The suture has a broadly rounded ventral lobe and a deeper lateral lobe.

Subvestinautilus, named by Turner, 1954, has been found in the Lower Carboniferous of Ireland and the Isle of Man.

References

 Bernhard Kummel, 1964.  Nautiloidea-Nautilida. Treatise on Invertebrate Paleontology, Part K. Geological Soc. of America and University of Kansas press. Teichert and Moore (eds)
 Koninckioceratidae-Paleodb

Prehistoric nautiloid genera
Prehistoric animals of Europe